Kragerup, also known as Kragerupgaard, is a manor house and estate located close to Høng, Kalundborg Municipality, som 0+ kilometres southwest of Copenhagen, Denmark. The estate has been owned by the Dinesen family since 1801. The main building is now operated as a hotel. It was listed on the Danish registry of protected buildings and places in 1918.

History

Early history
 
Kragerupgaard was originally a manor in the village of Kragerup. It is first mentioned in 1327 and 1341, when it was owned by Matheaus Jakobsen Taa. A later owner was Jens Nielsen Neb, and the ownership was then passed on to his children Henrik Jensen Neb and Christine Neb and her husband Hartvig Bryske. Over the next 150 years Kragerup was generally owned by multiple simultaneous owners.  Oluf Mortensen Gyrsting obtained almost full ownership of the estate towards the end of the 15th century.

After Gyrsting's death, Kragerup was passed on to his son-in-law, Peder Skram. In 1533, he sold Kragerup to his new father-in-law, Ove Lunge.

Friis family
 
After Lunge's death, Kragerup was passed on to his grandson, whose widow brought it into her second marriage with Jørgen Friis of Knastrup. Friis' son from a previous marriage, Christen Friis (1581–1639), inherited Kragerup in 1610. He served in the Kalmar War in 1611-1613 and was appointed Chancellor in 1616. He constructed a new, three-winged main building in 1627 and also extended the estate through the acquisition of more tenant farms in the surrounding villages.

Juul family
 
Friis' son, Hans Friis, sold Kragerup in 1656 to Frederik Urne. He was succeeded by his son-in-law, Ove Juul, who was later appointed Vice Chancellor. Kragerup was later passed on to his son, Christian Juul, who one year later ceded it to his sister, Mette Marie, who married the bailiff on the estate, Povl Pedersen Lerskov, but he died in 1692. Mette Marie Juul continued to live on the estate after his death.

Lerche, Fogh and Bech
In 1705, Kragerup was acquired by Jacob Lerche. He extended the estate with more tenant farms. In 1721, he sold it to Andreas Fogh. He carried out many improvements on the estate and increased prosperity. He is credited for being the first potato grower on Zealand and also established a wool factory. His daughter, Christine Fogh, sold the estate to Peder Bech around 1797.

Dinesen family
 
In 1801, Kragerup was acquired by Jens Kraft Dinesen, who had sold Gyldenholm to Christopher Schøller Bülow the previous year. He constructed a new main wing in 1802.

Dinesen was succeeded by his son Anders Didrich Dinesen. He was married to Sophie Jacobine de Neergaard, a daughter of Johan Michael de Neergaard. She managed the estate with great skill after his death but died at the age of 47 in 1857. Their son Jens Kraft Jacob Sophus Dinesen then inherited the estate. He married his younger brother's widow, Alvilde Dinesen, in 1880. Her son by her first husband, also called Jens Kraft Dinesen, inherited Kragerup in 1910. After his death in 1916 Kragerup was passed on to his son Wilhelm Dinesen.

Architecture
The main building is a three-winged, two-storey complex with white-washed walls and a half-hipped red tile roof. The main wing to the west stands on a rise slightly above the two side wings. It is 15 bays wide and has a central risalit topped by a rounded pediment.

List of owners
 (1327- ) Matheus Jakobsen Taa 
 (1356-1376) Jens Nielsen Neb 
 ( - ) Henrik Jensen Neb 
 ( - ) Jens Genvæther 
 (1382- ) Hartvig Bryske 
 ( - ) Birgitte Bryske 
 ( - ) Herman v. Hahn 
 ( - ) Christen Rud 
 ( - ) Ulf Limbek 
 ( - ) Jens Poulsen 
 ( - ) Eskil Gøye 
 ( - ) Claus Bryske 
 ( - ) Navne Jensen Gyrsting 
 (1445- ) Morten Jensen Gyrsting 
 (1460- ) Folmer Mortensen Gyrsting 
 (1468-1496) Oluf Mortensen Gyrsting 
 (1481- ) Jørgen Rud 
 (1505- ) Eggert Andersen Ulfeldt 
 ( -1533) Peder Skram 
 (1533- ) Ove Lunge 
 ( - ) Claus Eggertsen Ulfeldt 
 ( -1583) Eggert Ulfeldt 
 (1583- ) Elisabeth Galde, married 1) Ulfeldt, 2) Friis 
 ( -1610) Jørgen Friis 
 (1610-1639) Christen Friis 
 (1639-1653) Barbara Wittrup, married Friis 
 (1653-1656) Hans Friis 
 (1656-1658) Frederik Urne 
 (1658-1686) Ove Juul 
 (1686-1687) Christian Juul 
 (1687- ) Mette Marie Juul, married Lerskov 
 ( -1692) Poul Pedersen Lerskov 
 (1692-1705) Mette Marie Juul, married Lerskov 
 (1705-1721) Jacob Lerche 
 (1721-1762) Andreas Fogh 
 (1762-1774) Lars Fogh 
 (1774-1794) Clemens Fogh 
 (1774- ) Marie Fogh 
 (1774- ) Mette Fogh 
 (1794-1797) Christine Fogh 
 (1797-1801) Peder Bech 
 (1801-1827) Jens Kraft Dinesen 
 (1827-1840) Anders Didrich Dinesen 
 (1840-1857) Sophie Jacobine de Neergaard, married Dinesen 
 (1857-1910) Jens Kraft Jacob Sophus Dinesen 
 (1910-1916) Jens Kraft Dinesen 
 (1916-1932) Wilhelm Dinesen 
 (1932-1939) Ida Dinesen 
 (1939-1963) Jørgen Dinesen 
 (1963-1996) Erik S. Dinesen 
 (1996- ) Birgitte Dinesen

References 

Manor houses in Kalundborg Municipality
Listed castles and manor houses in Denmark
Buildings and structures associated with the Ulfeldt family
Buildings and structures associated with the Lerche family
Buildings and structures in Denmark associated with the Dinesen family